Arthur Adolf, Count of Posadowsky-Wehner, Baron of Postelwitz (3 June 1845 – 23 October 1932) was a German conservative statesman. He served as the secretary for the Treasury (1893–1897), secretary of the Interior, vice-chancellor of the German Empire and Prussian minister of State (1897–1907).

Biography
Born to Silesian nobility, the son of a judge, Posadowsky-Wehner studied law in Berlin, Heidelberg and Breslau and earned a doctorate in law in 1867. He subsequently acquired an agricultural property, and entered politics in 1871, when he became a member of the province government in Posen. In 1882 he became a member of the Parliament of Prussia, and was appointed Landeshauptmann of Posen in 1885.

Posadowsky was a crucial figure for the election reform in 1903. He took care of a new voting technique to protect the secrecy of the ballot for the German parliament.

Posadowsky-Wehner was the candidate of the German National People's Party for the Presidency of Germany in 1919, but he lost to Friedrich Ebert.

Honours
He received the following orders and decorations:

Publications 
Über die Altersversorgung der Arbeiter (1883)
Geschichte des schlesischen adligen Geschlechtes der Grafen Posadowsky-Wehner, Freiherren von Postelwitz (1891)
Luxus und Sparsamkeit (1909)
Die Wohnungsfrage als Kulturproblem (1910)
Volk und Regierung im neuen Reich (1932)

Notes

References

External links
 

1845 births
1932 deaths
People from Głogów
People from the Province of Silesia
Silesian nobility
German Protestants
German National People's Party politicians
Reich Party for Civil Rights and Deflation politicians
Vice-Chancellors of Germany
Finance ministers of Germany
Interior ministers of Germany
Members of the 13th Reichstag of the German Empire
Members of the Prussian House of Lords
Members of the Weimar National Assembly
Candidates for President of Germany
Grand Crosses of the Order of Saint Stephen of Hungary
Knights Grand Cross of the Order of Saints Maurice and Lazarus